Tsybin is a Russian surname. Notable people with the surname include:

Vladimir Tsybin (1877–1949), Russian flautist, composer, and conductor
Boris Tsybin (1928–2011), Soviet speed skater

Russian-language surnames